Hossein Taeb is an Iranian Shia cleric and senior Islamic Revolutionary Guard Corps official who was head of the IRGC's Intelligence Organization.

Biography
According to a biography from the "pro-government" Iran Student Correspondents Association summarized in the website Iran Rises, Taeb was born in 1342 (1963/4). After his middle education, he went to seminary school and reached an advanced degree (kharej) in Islamic jurisprudence after studying in Tehran, Mashhad, and Qom. He had studied with, among others, Supreme Leader Ali Khamenei. Taeb joined the Revolutionary Guards (which supervises the Basij) in 1361 (1982/3), beginning his work in Region 10 of Tehran and continued on to Qom and Mashhad. He was "for some time the Revolutionary Guards' coordinator with the Leader as well as the cultural commander of Imam Hossein College."

Under Taeb's command, the Basij played a key role in suppressing protest over the controversial 2009 Iranian presidential elections. The suppression saw the death of at least dozens of protesters on the streets or in prison.

In public statements Taeb has cautioned Iranians that the United States was "hiring agents and mercenaries in an effort to continue its plots for a soft overthrow of the Islamic Republic," according to the Iranian Fars news agency. Taeb has also stated that the post-election "anti-government riots" "killed eight members of the Basij and wounded 300 others."

In 2022, he and his family members were sanctioned by the US Department of States for his involvement in human rights violations in Iran. 

Taeb was dismissed from his position as head of Intelligence of the Islamic Revolutionary Guards Corps in June 2022. This is speculated to be due to an incident where an alleged Iranian operation to attack Israeli tourists in Turkey was outed, resulting in the arrest of the agents and a diplomatic spat with Turkey, as well as other incidents that suggested successful Israeli spy operations that Taeb failed to prevent. The dismissal also coincided with the arrest of Brig. General Ali Nasiri on suspicion of spying for Israel.

Offices
The list of his responsibilities includes:
 Deputy Culture of Joint Staff of the Islamic Revolutionary Guard Corps
 Commander department of Culture of Imam Hossein University
 Commander of the Basij from October 29, 2007 to 2009
 Head of the Intelligence Organization of the Islamic Revolutionary Guard Corps from October 2009 to June 2022

Personal life
He lost a brother in the Operation Karbala-5 during the Iran–Iraq War and is married with three children.

International sanctions 
Private property of Hossein Taeb is frozen by the European Union and he is not allowed to enter Europe because "forces under his command participated in mass beatings, murders, detentions and tortures of peaceful protestors." He has also been blacklisted by the U.S government.

References 

Iranian Shia clerics
1963 births
Living people
Directors of intelligence agencies
Islamic Revolutionary Guard Corps clerics